Reys is a village in Pir Sohrab Rural District, in the Central District of Chabahar County, Sistan and Baluchestan Province, Iran. At the 2006 census, its population was 34, in 6 families.

References 

Populated places in Chabahar County